Banker was an Australian bred Thoroughbred racehorse that won the 1863 Melbourne Cup.

The 1863 Melbourne Cup  was the smallest field in the Cup's history with only 7 horses in total and Banker's weight of 33.57 kg was the lightest weight carried by any winning horse in the Melbourne Cup.

Pedigree

References

Melbourne Cup winners
1860 racehorse births
Racehorses bred in Australia
Racehorses trained in Australia
Thoroughbred family 24